In computational geometry, a coreset is a small set of points that approximates the shape of a larger point set, in the sense that applying some geometric measure to the two sets (such as their minimum bounding box volume) results in approximately equal numbers. When this is the case, one obtains a linear-time or near-linear time approximation scheme, based on the idea of finding a coreset and then applying an exact optimization algorithm to the coreset.

References 

Computational geometry